In mathematics, more specifically in topology, an open map is a function between two topological spaces that maps open sets to open sets. 
That is, a function  is open if for any open set  in  the image  is open in  
Likewise, a closed map is a function that maps closed sets to closed sets. 
A map may be open, closed, both, or neither; in particular, an open map need not be closed and vice versa.

Open and closed maps are not necessarily continuous. Further, continuity is independent of openness and closedness in the general case and a continuous function may have one, both, or neither property; this fact remains true even if one restricts oneself to metric spaces. 
Although their definitions seem more natural, open and closed maps are much less important than continuous maps. 

Early study of open maps was pioneered by Simion Stoilow and Gordon Thomas Whyburn.

Definitions and characterizations

Let  be a function between topological spaces. If  is any set then  is called the image of  under

Competing definitions

There are two different competing, but closely related, definitions of "" that are widely used, where both of these definitions can be summarized as: "it is a map that sends open sets to open sets." 
The following terminology is sometimes used to distinguish between the two definitions. 

A map  is called a
 "" if whenever  is an open subset of the domain  then  is an open subset of 's codomain  
 "" if whenever  is an open subset of the domain  then  is an open subset of 's image  where as usual, this set is endowed with the subspace topology induced on it by 's codomain  

Every strongly open map is a relatively open map. However, these definitions are not equivalent in general.  

Warning: Many authors define "open map" to mean " open map" (for example, The Encyclopedia of Mathematics) while others define "open map" to mean " open map". In general, these definitions are  equivalent so it is thus advisable to always check what definition of "open map" an author is using. 

A surjective map is relatively open if and only if it strongly open; so for this important special case the definitions are equivalent. 
More generally, a map  is relatively open if and only if the surjection  is a strongly open map. 

Because  is always an open subset of  the image  of a strongly open map  must be an open subset of its codomain  In fact, a relatively open map is a strongly open map if and only if its image is an open subset of its codomain. 
In summary,

A map is strongly open if and only if it is relatively open and its image is an open subset of its codomain.

By using this characterization, it is often straightforward to apply results involving one of these two definitions of "open map" to a situation involving the other definition. 

The discussion above will also apply to closed maps if each instance of the word "open" is replaced with the word "closed".

Open maps

 is a relatively open map and its image  is an open subset of its codomain 
We can replace the first or both instances of the word "neighborhood" with "open neighborhood" in this condition and the result will still be an equivalent condition:
 for all subsets  of  where  denotes the topological interior of the set.
Whenever  is a closed subset of  then the set  is a closed subset of 
 This is a consequence of the identity  which holds for all subsets 

If  is a basis for  then the following can be appended to this list:

  maps basic open sets to open sets in its codomain (that is, for any basic open set   is an open subset of ).

Closed maps

A map  is called a  if whenever  is a closed subset of the domain  then  is a closed subset of 's image  where as usual, this set is endowed with the subspace topology induced on it by 's codomain  

 is a relatively closed map and its image  is a closed subset of its codomain 
 for every subset 
 for every closed subset 
 for every closed subset 
Whenever  is an open subset of  then the set  is an open subset of 
 The convergence  means that every open subset of  that contains  will contain  for all sufficiently large indices 

A surjective map is strongly closed if and only if it is relatively closed. So for this important special case, the two definitions are equivalent. 
By definition, the map  is a relatively closed map if and only if the surjection  is a strongly closed map. 

This does not happen with the definition of "open map" (which is: "every image of an open set is open") since the statement that results ("every image of a closed set is closed") is the definition of "closed map", which is in general  equivalent to openness. There exist open maps that are not closed and there also exist closed maps that are not open. This difference between open/closed maps and continuous maps is ultimately due to the fact that for any set  only  is guaranteed in general, whereas for preimages, equality  always holds.

Examples

If  has the discrete topology (that is, all subsets are open and closed) then every function  is both open and closed (but not necessarily continuous). 
This example shows that the image of a connected space under an open or closed map need not be connected. 

Whenever we have a product of topological spaces  the natural projections  are open (as well as continuous). 
Since the projections of fiber bundles and covering maps are locally natural projections of products, these are also open maps. 
Projections need not be closed however. Consider for instance the projection  on the first component; then the set  is closed in  but  is not closed in  
However, for a compact space  the projection  is closed. This is essentially the tube lemma.

To every point on the unit circle we can associate the angle of the positive -axis with the ray connecting the point with the origin. This function from the unit circle to the half-open interval [0,2π) is bijective, open, and closed, but not continuous. 
It shows that the image of a compact space under an open or closed map need not be compact. 
Also note that if we consider this as a function from the unit circle to the real numbers, then it is neither open nor closed. Specifying the codomain is essential.

Sufficient conditions

Every homeomorphism is open, closed, and continuous. In fact, a bijective continuous map is a homeomorphism if and only if it is open, or equivalently, if and only if it is closed. 

The composition of two (strongly) open maps is an open map and the composition of two (strongly) closed maps is a closed map. However, the composition of two relatively open maps need not be relatively open and similarly, the composition of two relatively closed maps need not be relatively closed.  

Let  be a map. 
Given any subset  if  is a relatively open (respectively, relatively closed, strongly open, strongly closed, continuous, surjective) map then the same is true of its restriction 

to the -saturated subset 

The categorical sum of two open maps is open, or of two closed maps is closed. 
The categorical product of two open maps is open, however, the categorical product of two closed maps need not be closed. 

A bijective map is open if and only if it is closed. 
The inverse of a bijective continuous map is a bijective open/closed map (and vice versa). 
A surjective open map is not necessarily a closed map, and likewise, a surjective closed map is not necessarily an open map. All local homeomorphisms, including all coordinate charts on manifolds and all covering maps, are open maps. 

A variant of the closed map lemma states that if a continuous function between locally compact Hausdorff spaces is proper then it is also closed. 

In complex analysis, the identically named open mapping theorem states that every non-constant holomorphic function defined on a connected open subset of the complex plane is an open map. 

The invariance of domain theorem states that a continuous and locally injective function between two -dimensional topological manifolds must be open. 

In functional analysis, the open mapping theorem states that every surjective continuous linear operator between Banach spaces is an open map. 
This theorem has been generalized to topological vector spaces beyond just Banach spaces. 

Every surjective open map is an almost open map but in general, the converse is not necessarily true. 
If a surjection  is an almost open map then it will be an open map if it satisfies the following condition (a condition that does  depend in any way on 's topology ): 
If the map is continuous then the above condition is also necessary for the map to be open. That is, if  is a continuous surjection then it is an open map if and only if it is almost open and it satisfies the above condition.

Properties

Open or closed maps that are continuous

If  is a continuous map that is also open  closed then: 
 if  is a surjection then it is a quotient map and even a hereditarily quotient map,
 A surjective map  is called  if for every subset  the restriction  is a quotient map. 
 if  is an injection then it is a topological embedding.
 if  is a bijection then it is a homeomorphism.

In the first two cases, being open or closed is merely a sufficient condition for the conclusion that follows. 
In the third case, it is necessary as well.

Open continuous maps

If  is a continuous (strongly) open map,  and  then:

 where  denotes the boundary of a set.
 where  denote the closure of a set.
If  where  denotes the interior of a set, then 

where this set  is also necessarily a regular closed set (in ). In particular, if  is a regular closed set then so is  And if  is a regular open set then so is  
If the continuous open map  is also surjective then  and moreover,  is a regular open (resp. a regular closed) subset of  if and only if  is a regular open (resp. a regular closed) subset of  

See also

Notes

Citations

References

  
  
  

General topology
Theory of continuous functions
Lemmas